Zambia competed at the 2016 Summer Olympics in Rio de Janeiro, Brazil, from 5 to 21 August 2016. This was the nation's thirteenth appearance at the Summer Olympics, although it marked its official debut in 1964 under the name Northern Rhodesia. Zambia missed the 1976 Summer Olympics in Montreal, because of its partial support to the African boycott.

The National Olympic Committee of Zambia (NOCZ) sent a team of seven athletes, five men and two women, to compete in four different sports at the Games, matching its roster size with London 2012. The Zambian delegation featured two returning Olympians from the previous Games, including freestyle swimmer Jade Ashleigh Howard and sprinter Gerald Phiri in the men's 100 metres. 20-year-old swimmer and 2014 Youth Olympian Ralph Goveia (men's 100 m butterfly) was Zambia's youngest competitor, while half-lightweight judoka Mathews Punza (men's 66 kg), the oldest of the team (aged 28), served as the nation's flag bearer in the opening ceremony.

Zambia, however, failed to win a single Olympic medal since the 1996 Summer Olympics in Atlanta, where Samuel Matete bagged a silver in the men's 400 m hurdles. Punza and sprinter Kabange Mupopo (women's 400 metres) were the only Zambians to progress beyond the first round of their respective sporting events at the Games, but neither of them reached the final and had the opportunity to end their nation's 20-year podium drought.

Athletics (track and field)
 
Zambian athletes have so far achieved qualifying standards in the following athletics events (up to a maximum of 3 athletes in each event):

Track & road events

Key
Note–Ranks given for track events are within the athlete's heat only
Q = Qualified for the next round
q = Qualified for the next round as a fastest loser or, in field events, by position without achieving the qualifying target
NR = National record
SB = Seasonal best
N/A = Round not applicable for the event
Bye = Athlete not required to compete in round

Boxing
 
Zambia has received an invitation from the Tripartite Commission to send a male boxer competing in the middleweight division to the Games.

Judo
 
Zambia has qualified one judoka for the men's half-lightweight category (66 kg) at the Games. Mathews Punza earned a continental quota spot from the African region, as Zambia's top-ranked judoka outside of direct qualifying position in the IJF World Ranking List of May 30, 2016.

Swimming

Zambia has received a Universality invitation from FINA to send two swimmers (one male and one female) to the Olympics.

References

External links 
 

Nations at the 2016 Summer Olympics
2016
Olympics